Petrovë is a village in Shtime municipality, Kosovo.

Notes

References 

Villages in Štimlje